January 29 - Eastern Orthodox liturgical calendar - January 31

All fixed commemorations below are observed on February 12 by Eastern Orthodox Churches on the Old Calendar.

For January 30th, Orthodox Churches on the Old Calendar commemorate the Saints listed on January 17.

Feasts
 Synaxis of the Three Holy Hierarchs: 
 Saint Basil the Great, Saint Gregory the Theologian, and Saint John Chrysostom.

Saints
 Hieromartyr Hippolytus, priest, of Antioch, martyred in the period of the heretical Novatianists.
 Hieromartyr Hippolytus of Rome, Bishop of Rome, and those with him: 
 Martyrs Censorinus, Sabinus, Ares (Aares), the virgin Chryse (Chryse of Rome), Felix, Maximus, Herculianus, Venerius, Styracius, Mennas, Commodus, Hermes, Maurus, Eusebius, Rusticus, Monagrius, Amandinus, Olympius, Cyprus, Theodore the Tribune, the priest Maximus, the deacon Archelaus, and the bishop Cyriacus, at Ostia, – under Roman Emperor Claudius Gothicus and a vicarius named Ulpius Romulus (269)  (see also August 13 -  Hippolytus of Rome - who may or may not be the same individual)
 Venerable Zeno the Hermit, of Antioch (414), disciple of St. Basil the Great.
 Martyr Theophilus the New, in Cyprus (784)
 Venerable Kyriakos, ascetic of the Great Lavra of St. Sabbas the Sanctified (7th-8th centuries)
 Saint Peter I of Bulgaria, King of Bulgaria (969)

Pre-Schism Western saints
 Saint Martina of Rome, a martyr in Rome under Alexander Severus (228)
 Saint Savina of Milan (Sabina), born in Milan, she ministered to martyrs in prison and buried their bodies during the persecution of Diocletian (311)
 Saint Armentarius of Antibes, first Bishop of Antibes in Provence in France (ca. 451)
 Martyrs Felician, Philippian and Companions, a group of one hundred and twenty-six martyrs in North Africa.
 Saint Tudy (Tudclyd, Tybie), a virgin in Wales; St Tybie's church in Llandybie in Dyfed is named after her (5th century)
 Saint Adelgonda, foundress of Maubeuge Abbey (680)
 Saint Balthildes, Queen of France (680)
 Saint Armentarius of Pavia, Bishop of Pavia (ca. 711)
 Saint Amnichad (Amnuchad), a monk and then a hermit at Fulda monastery (1043)

Post-Schism Orthodox saints
 Venerable Zeno the Faster, of the Kiev Caves Monastery (14th century)
 New Martyr Hadji Theodore of Mytilene (Mt. Athos) (1784)
 New Martyr Demetrius of Sliven (1841)
 Saint Theophil, fool-for-Christ, of Svyatogorsk Monastery (1868)
 Blessed Pelagia of Diveyevo Monastery, fool-for-Christ (1884)

New martyrs and confessors
 New Hieromartyr Vladimir Kristenovich, Priest (1933)
 New Martyr Stephen Nalivayko (1945)

Other commemorations
 Finding of the Wonderworking Icon of Panagia Evangelistria of Tinos (1823)  (see also: December 18)
 Commemoration of the deliverance of the island of Zakynthos from the plague by Saint George the Great-Martyr (1688)

Icon gallery

Notes

References

Sources
 January 30 / February 12. Orthodox Calendar (PRAVOSLAVIE.RU).
 February 12 / January 30. HOLY TRINITY RUSSIAN ORTHODOX CHURCH (A parish of the Patriarchate of Moscow).
 January 30. OCA - The Lives of the Saints.
 The Autonomous Orthodox Metropolia of Western Europe and the Americas (ROCOR). St. Hilarion Calendar of Saints for the year of our Lord 2004. St. Hilarion Press (Austin, TX). p. 11.
 January 30. Latin Saints of the Orthodox Patriarchate of Rome.
 The Roman Martyrology. Transl. by the Archbishop of Baltimore. Last Edition, According to the Copy Printed at Rome in 1914. Revised Edition, with the Imprimatur of His Eminence Cardinal Gibbons. Baltimore: John Murphy Company, 1916. pp. 30–32.
 Rev. Richard Stanton. A Menology of England and Wales, or, Brief Memorials of the Ancient British and English Saints Arranged According to the Calendar, Together with the Martyrs of the 16th and 17th Centuries. London: Burns & Oates, 1892. pp. 40–41.
Greek Sources
 Great Synaxaristes:  30 ΙΑΝΟΥΑΡΙΟΥ. ΜΕΓΑΣ ΣΥΝΑΞΑΡΙΣΤΗΣ.
  Συναξαριστής. 30 Ιανουαρίου. ECCLESIA.GR. (H ΕΚΚΛΗΣΙΑ ΤΗΣ ΕΛΛΑΔΟΣ). 
Russian Sources
  12 февраля (30 января). Православная Энциклопедия под редакцией Патриарха Московского и всея Руси Кирилла (электронная версия). (Orthodox Encyclopedia - Pravenc.ru).
  30 января (ст.ст.) 12 февраля 2013 (нов. ст.). Русская Православная Церковь Отдел внешних церковных связей. (DECR).

January in the Eastern Orthodox calendar